Titanium ethoxide is a chemical compound with the formula Ti4(OCH2CH3)16. It is a commercially available colorless liquid that is soluble in organic solvents but hydrolyzes readily. Alkoxides of titanium(IV) and zirconium(IV) are used in organic synthesis and materials science. They adopt more complex structures than suggested by their empirical formulas.

Syntheses
Titanium ethoxide is prepared by treating titanium tetrachloride with ethanol in the presence of an amine:
TiCl4 + 4 EtOH + 4 Et3N → Ti(OEt)4 + 4 Et3NHCl
The purity of titanium ethoxide is commonly assayed by proton NMR spectroscopy. Ti(OEt)4 1H NMR (90 MHz, chloroform-d, ppm): 4.36 (quartet, 8H, CH2), 1.27 (triplet, 12H, CH3).

Structure
Both Ti(OEt)4 exist mainly as tetramers with an octahedral coordination environment around the metal centers. There are two types of titanium centers, depending on the number of terminal vs bridging alkoxide ligands. Zr(OEt)4 is structurally similar. The virtual symmetry of the M4O16 core structure for the tetramer structures of these compounds is C2h.

Related compounds

Titanium methoxide
Like the ethoxide, titanium methoxide Ti(OMe)4 exists as a tetramer with each of the TiIV metal centers having an octahedral coordination environment.

Titanium isopropoxide

With bulky alky groups, Ti(OiPr)4 in contrast exist as a monomer with a tetrahedral environment around the Ti center. This lower degree of coordination to the metal center is attributed to the steric bulk of the iPr groups versus the n-alkyl groups, this serves to prevent bridging interactions between the metal centers.

Zirconium ethoxide
Zirconium ethoxide can be prepared in a manner similar but not identical to the titanium compound:
ZrCl4 + 5 NaOEt + EtOH → NaH[Zr(OEt)6] + 4 NaCl
NaH[Zr(OEt)6] + HCl → Zr(OEt)4 + NaCl + 2 EtOH

A more common synthesis for zirconium ethoxide is to treat zirconium tetrachloride with the desired alcohol and ammonia:
ZrCl4 + 4 ROH + 4 NH3  →  Zr(OR)4 + 4 NH4Cl
Zirconium ethoxide can also be prepared with zirconocene dichloride:

Cp2ZrCl2  +  4 EtOH  +  2 Et3N   →   2 CpH  +  2 Et3NHCl  +  Zr(OEt)4

Zirconium propoxide
Zr(OnPr)4 also adopts the titanium ethoxide structure.

Reactions
Both Ti and Zr alkoxides can be used to deposit microstructured films of TiO2 or ZrO2:
M(OEt)4 + 2 H2O → MO2 + 4 EtOH

These films form via a hydrolysis of the alkoxide. The resulting oxides are chemically resilient. The structure of the metal oxide films grown in this matter is affected by the presence of base or acid catalysts for the hydrolysis. Generally acid-catalysis yields a sol where the polymer chains are randomly oriented and linear. In the base-mediated case bushy clusters or crosslinked networks are produced, these structures can trap solvent and reaction byproducts and form a gel coating. TiIV and ZrIV alkoxides are also potential starting materials for Ziegler–Natta catalysts used in alkene polymerization. Intermediates in the hydrolysis have been crystallized.  They feature interior oxides in addition to the ethoxide on the exterior of the clusters.

References

Ethoxides
Titanium(IV) compounds